Billy Dale may refer to:

 Billy Dale (footballer) (born 1925), English soccer player
 Billy Dale, American White House employee acquitted of criminal charges in 1995